Niccolò Canepa (born 14 May 1988 in Genoa) is an Italian professional motorcycle road racer contracted from 2022 to RNF Racing in the MotoE World Cup aboard an Energica Ego Corsa. Canepa won the 2007 European Superstock 1000 Championship on a Ducati, and spent 2008 as a tester of their MotoGP and World Superbike machines.

Career

Canepa previously competed in the Italian Superstock Championship, the Italian Supersport Championship, and the Superstock 600 UEM European Championship, where he finished runner-up in 2006. He was given three World Superbike wild card rides in the second half of the  season, qualifying on the second row for his debut at Brno, on his first experience of the one-shot "Superpole" system. He raced in MotoGP full-time for Pramac Ducati in 2009 with little success, and made an uncompetitive start in Moto2.

Canepa moved in 2016 to the World Endurance Championship riding the Factory GMT94 Yamaha R1. He ended the season in second place.

In 2017 Canepa won the FIM Endurance World Championship (EWC). He is the first Italian in history to win an Endurance World Championship. He is also the Yamaha Superbike Factory Team test rider and replacement rider. He is also coaching Alex Lowes and Michael Van Der Mark during the Superbike World Championship.

Career statistics

Supersport World Championship

By season

Races by year
(key) (Races in bold indicate pole position; races in italics indicate fastest lap)

Superbike World Championship

By season

Races by year
(key) (Races in bold indicate pole position; races in italics indicate fastest lap)

Grand Prix motorcycle racing

By season

By class

Races by year
(key) (Races in bold indicate pole position; races in italics indicate fastest lap)

 Half points awarded as less than two thirds of the race distance (but at least three full laps) was completed.

References

External links

 

1988 births
Living people
Italian motorcycle racers
Superbike World Championship riders
Pramac Racing MotoGP riders
Moto2 World Championship riders
FIM Superstock 1000 Cup riders
Sportspeople from Genoa
MotoGP World Championship riders
MotoE World Cup riders